Sertulariidae is a family of hydrozoans.

Genera
According to the World Register of Marine Species, the following genera belong to this family:
Abietinaria Kirchenpauer, 1884
Amphisbetia L. Agassiz, 1862
Caledoniana Galea, 2015
Caminothujaria von Campenhausen, 1896
Crateritheca Stechow, 1921
Dictyocladium Allman, 1888
Diphasia Agassiz, 1862
Dynamena Lamouroux, 1812
Fraseroscyphus Boero & Bouillon, 1993
Geminella Billard, 1925
Gigantotheca Vervoort & Watson, 2003
Gonaxia Vervoort, 1993
Hydrallmania Hincks, 1868
Hypopyxis Allman, 1888
Idiellana Cotton & Godfrey, 1942
Mixoscyphus Peña Cantero & Vervoort, 2005
Papilionella Antsulevich & Vervoort, 1993
Polysertularella Antsulevich, 2011
Salacia Lamouroux, 1816
Sertularia Linnaeus, 1758
Solenoscyphus Galea, 2015
Stereotheca Stechow, 1919
Tamarisca Kudelin, 1914
Tasmanaria Watson & Vervoort, 2001
Thuiaria Fleming, 1828

References

 
Sertularioidea
Cnidarian families